FM (an initialism for Fuse Music) is an American digital cable television network that launched on September 30, 2015. The network replaced NuvoTV, which was merged into Fuse on the same day.

History
At the 2015 upfronts, it was announced that NuvoTV would be folded into Fuse, as the network began expanding beyond music programming and introduced a new programming slate targeting "New Young Americans". In addition, Fuse announced the launch of FM, a new music channel focusing on "up-and-coming, young, diverse talent".

Initially, FM aired music programming during the daytime, including video blocks and original shows, with holdover programming from NuvoTV shown in primetime. Since 2018, FM has engaged in channel drift, phasing out its music video blocks in favor of reruns of Fuse and NuvoTV original programming and acquired sitcoms. Around this time, Fuse was dropped by Comcast Xfinity and Verizon Fios due to low ratings and its reliance on reruns, although Comcast would later bring back the network in December 2021. In 2019, Fuse Media filed for Chapter 11 bankruptcy protection.

References

Music television channels
Music video networks in the United States
Fuse (TV channel)
English-language television stations in the United States
Television channels and stations established in 2015
2015 establishments in California